These are the late night schedules on all three networks for each calendar season beginning September 1966. All times are Eastern/Pacific.

The United Network launched in spring 1967 with its lone program, The Las Vegas Show. The show and network ended after one month and 23 episodes, most of which aired on CBS stations in areas where the United Network did not own a station.

NET is not included, as member television stations have local flexibility over most of their schedules and broadcast times for network shows may vary, ABC is not included on the weekend schedules (as the network do not offer late night programs of any kind on weekends).

Talk/Variety shows are highlighted in yellow, Local News & Programs are highlighted in white.

Monday-Friday

Saturday/Sunday

By network

ABC

New Series
The Joey Bishop Show

Not returning from 1965-66
ABC's Nightlife with Les Crane

NBC

Returning Series
The Saturday/Sunday Tonight Show
The Tonight Show Starring Johnny Carson

New Series
The Weekend Tonight Show *

U

New Series
The Las Vegas Show *

United States late night network television schedules
1966 in American television
1967 in American television